Lismore Comprehensive School is a comprehensive school located in Craigavon, County Armagh, Northern Ireland. It is a Catholic maintained school and was opened in 1972. The name comes from the Irish an lios mor meaning the big fort; an ancient Bronze Age ringfort that lies within the school grounds.

Facilities
Lismore applied for a new building as the original building was designed to accommodate 300 pupils and the school has since grown to over 1,000 pupils. Approval was given in 2014 for the building of a new school, which is currently under construction and is due to be completed in 2023.

References

External links

Catholic secondary schools in Northern Ireland
Secondary schools in County Armagh